Subresource Integrity or SRI is a W3C recommendation to provide a method to protect website delivery. Specifically, it validates assets served by a third party, such as a content delivery network (CDN). This ensures these assets have not been compromised for hostile purposes. SRI was created in response to a number of attacks where CDN-served content was injected with malicious code, compromising thousands of websites using it.

To use SRI, a website author wishing to include a resource from a third party can specify a cryptographic hash of the resource in addition to the location of the resource. Browsers fetching the resource can then compare the hash provided by the website author with the hash computed from the resource. If the hashes don't match, the resource is discarded.

A sample script element with integrity and crossorigin attribute used by the SRI:

References

External links
 Subresource Integrity on Mozilla Developer Network (MDN) 
 W3C specification
 SRI on Mozilla Wiki

Wireless networking standards
World Wide Web Consortium standards